Lazarus Denison Shoemaker (November 5, 1819 – September 11, 1893) was an American politician from Pennsylvania who served as a Republican member of the U.S. House of Representatives for Pennsylvania's 12th congressional district from 1871 to 1875.

Biography
Lazarus D. Shoemaker was born in Kingston, Pennsylvania to Elijah and Elisabeth S. (Denison) Shoemaker.  He attended Nazareth Hall in Nazareth, Pennsylvania, and Kenyon College in Gambier, Ohio.  He graduated from Yale College in 1840.  He studied law, was admitted to the bar in 1842 and commenced practice in Wilkes-Barre, Pennsylvania.  He was a member of the Pennsylvania State Senate for the 12th district from 1867 to 1870.

Shoemaker was elected as a Republican to the Forty-second and Forty-third Congresses.  He served as chairman of the United States House Committee on Revolutionary Pensions during the Forty-third Congress.  He was not a candidate for renomination in 1874.  He resumed the practice of his profession and also engaged in banking.  He died in Wilkes-Barre in 1893.  Interment in Forty Fort Cemetery in Forty Fort, Pennsylvania.

Notes

References

The Political Graveyard

|-

1819 births
1893 deaths
19th-century American politicians
Burials in Pennsylvania
Pennsylvania lawyers
Republican Party Pennsylvania state senators
People from Kingston, Pennsylvania
People from the Scranton–Wilkes-Barre metropolitan area
Republican Party members of the United States House of Representatives from Pennsylvania
Yale College alumni
19th-century American lawyers